The Lithuania national rugby league team represents Lithuania in international rugby league football competitions. They made their debut in rugby league nines at the 2019 London Nines, of which they finished runners up to the London Skolars. Lithuania made their full 13-a-side debut an international friendly against Wales Dragonhearts 58–0.

References

National rugby league teams
R